The Landlord is a 1970 American comedy-drama film directed by Hal Ashby, adapted by Bill Gunn from the 1966 novel by Kristin Hunter. The film stars Beau Bridges in the lead role of a privileged and ignorant white man who selfishly becomes landlord of an inner-city tenement, unaware that the people he is responsible for are low-income, streetwise residents. Also in the cast are Lee Grant, Diana Sands, Pearl Bailey, and Louis Gossett Jr. The film was Ashby's directorial debut.

Plot
Elgar Enders, who lives off an allowance from his wealthy parents, buys an inner-city tenement in Park Slope, Brooklyn, which is undergoing gentrification, planning to evict the occupants and construct a luxury home for himself. However, once he ventures into the tenement, he grows fond of the low-income black residents. Enders decides to remain as the landlord, and help fix the building. He rebels against his WASP upbringing, and to his parents' dismay, romances two black women.

The first is Lanie, a mixed-race dancer at a local black club. Lanie has light skin and features due to a mother of Irish descent, and a father of African descent, and has experienced colorism. Their relationship is strained, as Elgar has an affair with one of his tenants, Fanny, and gets her pregnant. Her boyfriend Copee, a black activist with an identity crisis, is enraged when he finds out about the pregnancy, and tries to kill Elgar with an axe but ultimately stops.

The Enders family is shaken by their son's behavior, but reluctantly accepts him. Ultimately, Fanny gives the child up for adoption to start a new life. The story ends with Elgar’s taking custody of the child, mending his relationship with Lanie, and moving in with her.

Cast

Charlie Murphy, older brother of Eddie Murphy, lived in the neighborhood where the film was shot, and he appears in a brief scene as a boy stealing Elgar's hubcaps.

Reception
The film was a commercial disappointment. Arthur Krim of United Artists later did an assessment of the film as part of an evaluation of the company's inventory:
What was expected to be provocative material to the new modern film audience of 1968-1969 in depicting black and white relationships in an urban setting, emerged as a film which we felt would be of limited interest to the audience of 1970 - an audience more and more sated with films of this genre. This is still a type of film we intend to continue to make but at one-quarter the cost. Unfortunately, at the time this film was programmed, unrealistic optimism about the potential audience for this type of film prevailed.

Critical reaction
The film garnered mostly positive reviews from critics. On Rotten Tomatoes, it has received a 92% overall approval from 12 critics. Upon its release, New York Times film critic Howard Thompson, called the film "a wondrously wise, sad and hilarious comedy." On September 19, 2007, journalist Mike Hale discussed the film in a New York Times article called "Before Gentrification Was Cool, It Was a Movie". Hale praised the film for tackling the racial tension that arose in the aftermath of the assassination of Martin Luther King Jr. and wrote in surprise how the film "would disappear after its 1970 release – rarely shown and just as rarely discussed."

Awards and nominations

See also
 List of American films of 1970

References

Further reading
 Sieving, Christopher J. Soul Searching: Black-Themed Cinema from the March on Washington to the Rise of Blaxploitation, Wesleyan University Press (2011). 280pp. https://www.amazon.com/Soul-Searching-Black-Themed-Washington-Blaxploitation/dp/0819571334

External links
 
 
 
 

1970 films
1970s romantic comedy-drama films
1970s satirical films
American romantic comedy-drama films
American satirical films
Films about race and ethnicity
Films based on American novels
Films directed by Hal Ashby
Films set in Brooklyn
Films set in New York City
Films about interracial romance
United Artists films
Films about landlords
1970 directorial debut films
1970s English-language films
1970s American films